Leutnant Hans von Keudell (5 April 1892 – 15 February 1917) was a World War I flying ace credited with twelve aerial victories.

Early life and service
Keudell was educated in Berlin. In 1904, he joined the cadets at Bensberg. In 1911, he joined the Uhlans. He began World War I with the Uhlans, and went into combat with them in both France and Poland. He was commissioned by April 1915, transferred to aviation and began training on 7 June. On 13 December, he was posted to fly bombing missions, objectives Verdun, Toul, and Dunkirk, for Brieftauben Abteilung Ostende.

Service as a fighter pilot
By early summer of 1916, Keudell was training as a fighter pilot. On 4 August, he joined KEK B under the command of Hans Bethge. From there, on 22 August, Keudell became a founding member of Jagdstaffel 1, destined to fly successively a Fokker D.I, a Halberstadt D.III and an Albatros D.III for them. On 31 August 1916, he shot down a Martinsyde Elephant for his first win. He then scored steadily through the rest of the year, reaching ten on 22 November.

On 1 January 1917, Keudell was awarded the Knight's Cross with Swords of the Royal House Order of Hohenzollern. He shot down his eleventh victim on 24 January 1917. On 5 February, he was appointed to raise and command Jagdstaffel 27. He then scored the brand new jasta's first victory on 15 February, only to be in turn killed in action flying Albatros D III #2017/17 by Lt. Stuart Harvey Pratt, flying a Nieuport two-seater of No. 46 Squadron RFC. Keudell's Albatros landed behind British lines and was salvaged by the Royal Flying Corps to become an item in their fleet of captured aircraft.

Sources of information

References
 Above the Lines: The Aces and Fighter Units of the German Air Service, Naval Air Service and Flanders Marine Corps 1914 - 1918 Norman L. R. Franks, et al. Grub Street, 1993. , .
 Early German Aces of World War I. Greg VanWyngarden, Harry Dempsey. Osprey Publishing, 2006. , .

1892 births
1917 deaths
Prussian Army personnel
Luftstreitkräfte personnel
German military personnel killed in World War I
Aviators killed by being shot down
German World War I flying aces
Military personnel from Berlin